Brixton is an area of south London. 

It gives its name to:
Brixton Academy, a music venue
Brixton House, a theatre
Brixton Market, a street market
Brixton murals, murals painted in the 1980s
Brixton railway station, a national rail station
Brixton tube station, a Victoria Line tube station
HM Prison Brixton, the prison in the area
Hundred of Brixton, an ancient county subdivision of Surrey

Brixton may also refer to:

Places
Brixton, Devon, England
Brixton, Johannesburg, South Africa
Brixton Deverill, Wiltshire, England
Brighstone, a village on the Isle of Wight, which used to be called Brixton

Other uses
 Brixton (album), a 2018 album by British rapper Sneakbo
 Brixton plc, a defunct British industrial and commercial property business